The 1986 NCAA Division III men's basketball tournament was the 12th annual single-elimination tournament to determine the national champions of National Collegiate Athletic Association (NCAA) men's Division III collegiate basketball in the United States.

Held during March 1986, the field included thirty-two teams and the final championship rounds were contested at Calvin College in Grand Rapids, Michigan.

SUNY Potsdam defeated LeMoyne–Owen, 76–73, to claim their second NCAA Division III national title and first since 1981. The Bears also completed an undefeated season (32–0), the first Division III program to complete this feat.

Bracket

Regional No. 1

Regional No. 2

Regional No. 3

Regional No. 4

Regional No. 5

Regional No. 6

Regional No. 7

Regional No. 8

National Quarterfinals

All-tournament team
 Roosevelt Bullock, Potsdam (Most outstanding player)
 Barry Stanton, Potsdam
 Johnny Mayers, Jersey City State
 Michael Neal, LeMoyne–Owen
 Dana Janssen, Nebraska Wesleyan

See also
1986 NCAA Division I men's basketball tournament
1986 NCAA Division II men's basketball tournament
1986 NAIA men's basketball tournament
1986 NCAA Division III women's basketball tournament

References

NCAA Division III men's basketball tournament
NCAA Men's Division III Basketball
Ncaa Tournament
NCAA Division III basketball tournament